The 2019–20 Ohio State Buckeyes women's basketball team represented the Ohio State University during the 2019–20 NCAA Division I women's basketball season. The Buckeyes, led by 7th year head coach Kevin McGuff, played their home games at Value City Arena and were members of the Big Ten Conference.

They finished the season 21–12, 11–7 in Big Ten play to finish in a tie for fifth place. As the sixth seed in the Big Ten women's basketball tournament the defeated Minnesota, Iowa, and Michigan before losing to Maryland in the finals. They did not get a chance for further post season play, as the NCAA women's basketball tournament and WNIT were cancelled before they began due to the COVID-19 pandemic.

Previous season
The Buckeyes finished the season 14–15, 10–8 in Big Ten play to finish in fifth place. They lost in the second round of the Big Ten women's basketball tournament to Wisconsin. They received an automatic bid to the WNIT where they were upset by Morehead State in the first round.

Roster

Schedule and results

Source:

|-
!colspan=9 style=| Exhibition

|-
!colspan=9 style=| Non-conference regular season

|-
!colspan=9 style=| Big Ten regular season

|-
! colspan=9 style=| Big Ten Women's Tournament

Rankings

See also
 2019–20 Ohio State Buckeyes men's basketball team

References

Ohio State Buckeyes women's basketball seasons
Ohio State
Ohio State Buckeyes
Ohio State Buckeyes